Japonicrambus ishizukai is a moth in the family Crambidae. It was described by Okano in 1962. It is found in Japan (Honshu).

References

Crambinae
Moths described in 1962